Walden Pond Press, established in 2008, is the co-publishing venture of film production company Walden Media and book publisher HarperCollins. 
The venture operates as an imprint of HarperCollins Children’s Books and its logo, a skipping stone on Walden Pond, is derivative of the Walden Media logo.

Background

Walden Pond Press publishes 'middle-grade classics'. For example, Root Magic (published January 2021) by author Eden Royce, and The Troubled Girls of Dragomir Academy (published October 2021) by author Anne Ursu, are both in development by Walden Media.

Audience

Walden Pond Press publishes a small, targeted list of middle grade book titles every year. Notable titles include Cosmic by Frank Cottrell Boyce (2010); The Fourth Stall by Chris Rylander (2011); Breadcrumbs by Anne Ursu (2011); The Hero’s Guide series by Christopher Healy (2012-2015); Ms. Bixby’s Last Day by John David Anderson (2016); National Book Award Longlist winners The Real Boy by Anne Ursu (2013) and Orphan Island by Laurel Snyder (2017); A Boy Called Bat and sequels by Elana K. Arnold (2017-2020); York: The Shadow Cipher and sequels by Laura Ruby (2019-2021); Love Sugar Magic and sequels by Anna Meriano (2018-2020); and A Perilous Journey of Danger & Mayhem: The Dastardly Plot and sequels by Christopher Healy (2018-2020), among others.

Prior partnership

Walden Pond Press is Walden Media’s second co-publishing venture with a major US publishing house. From 2004 to 2008 Walden Media worked across all imprints at Penguin Young Readers Group, publishing the Newbery Honor-winning Savvy by first-time author Ingrid Law (Dial/Walden Media), Mike Lupica’s The Comeback Kids series (Philomel/Walden Media), Lauren St. John’s The White Giraffe series (Dial/Walden Media), and Michael Reisman’s Simon Bloom series (Dutton/Walden Media), among other titles.

Authors
The publisher has published books by authors including Paul Adam, Steven Knight, Anne Ursu, Kevin Emerson, Jarrett J. Krosoczka, John David Anderson, Frank Cottrell Boyce, Elana K. Arnold, Laura Ruby, and Laurel Snyder.

Walden Pond Press publishing history

References

External links 
 http://www.walden.com/books

Publishing companies of the United States
Children's book publishers
Book publishing companies based in Massachusetts
HarperCollins books
Publishing companies established in 2008